Laura J. Alber (born 1968) is an American businesswoman who in 2010 became the CEO of Williams-Sonoma, Inc.

Early life
Alber earned a B.A. in psychology from the University of Pennsylvania.  While attending Penn, Alber had a small business selling velvet floppy hats.  She said she got the idea after observing the floppy hat trend while a student at the University of Edinburgh. As a student, she took a wide range of classes, which she has said later served her well as a business executive. After graduation from Penn, Alber drove to California with no plan and took a series of odd jobs until taking an entry-level job at Gap Inc.

Career
She joined Williams-Sonoma in 1995 as a senior buyer in the Pottery Barn subsidiary brand.  Alber was promoted several times. She has said that her most important job, prior to becoming CEO of Williams-Sonoma, was serving as director of the Pottery Barn catalog, giving her the opportunity to “own” a business line from start to finish. She later became president of Pottery Barn, serving in that capacity from 2002 to 2006.

Alber moved to the newly created role of president of Williams-Sonoma in 2006, where she continued her lead of Pottery Barn and the company's global supply chain, distribution, and worldwide logistics.

In 2010, she was elected to the company's board and named as CEO, replacing retiring W. Howard Lester.

In September 2011, she was ranked the 10th highest paid woman in U.S. business by Fortune magazine, with an estimated compensation of $13,555,412.

She has said she enjoys the intellectual challenge of understanding the changing trends and global influences on the home. After being pregnant with her first daughter, Alber said she was inspired to create Pottery Barn Kids, providing home furnishings for children's spaces. Alber also led the creation of the Pottery Barn Bed+Bath, PBteen, and Threads brands.
In 2011, the San Francisco Business Times named her one of the most influential women in San Francisco.

Under Alber's leadership, Williams-Sonoma became one of the largest U.S. e-tailers, selling about half of its $5 billion annual sales online in 2014. During her tenure, Williams-Sonoma launched its first app - "Recipe of the Day" - and partnered with YouTube to offer shoppable online videos. Alber has also promoted in-store events at Williams-Sonoma, including book signings and panini-making classes.
In 2014 and 2015, Fortune magazine named Alber a "Business Person of the Year."

In 2014, Alber wrote a Harvard Business Review article, advocating for blending art and science in business by informing creative ideas with analytics.

Personal
Laura is married with three children.  She was a member of the advisory board of the Richardson Bay Audubon Center.

She is on the board of overseers for the College of Arts & Science at The University of Pennsylvania.  She and her husband also created the Alber-Klingelhofer Endowed Scholarship at Penn. In 2014, Alber was the graduation speaker at the College of Arts and Sciences at the University of Pennsylvania, where she encouraged "present mindedness"  which she defined as focusing on doing what you love, rather than only planning for it.

She became a member of the board of directors of Fitbit in 2016.

References

Businesspeople from the San Francisco Bay Area
American retail chief executives
American corporate directors
University of Pennsylvania School of Arts and Sciences alumni
American women chief executives
Women corporate directors
Williams-Sonoma people
1968 births
Living people
20th-century American businesspeople
20th-century American businesswomen
21st-century American businesspeople
21st-century American businesswomen